The Fighting Chance is a surviving 1920 American silent drama film directed by Charles Maigne and written by Will M. Ritchey. It was formerly thought to be lost. The film stars Anna Q. Nilsson, Conrad Nagel, Clarence Burton, Dorothy Davenport, Herbert Prior, and Ruth Helms. It is based on the 1906 novel The Fighting Chance by Robert W. Chambers. The film was released on August 1, 1920, by Paramount Pictures.

Cast
Anna Q. Nilsson as Sylvia Landis
Conrad Nagel as Stephen Siward
Clarence Burton as	Leroy Mortimer
Dorothy Davenport as Leila Mortimer
Herbert Prior as Kemp Farrell 
Ruth Helms as Grace Farrell
Bertram Grassby as	Howard Quarrier
Maude Wayne as Lydia Vyse
Fred R. Stanton as Beverly Plank 
William H. Brown as Maj.

References

External links 

 
Lantern slide
 Chambers, Robert W. (1906), The Fighting Chance, New York: D. Appleton and Company, on the Internet Archive

1920 films
1920s English-language films
Silent American drama films
1920 drama films
Paramount Pictures films
Films based on works by Robert W. Chambers
Films directed by Charles Maigne
American black-and-white films
American silent feature films
1920s rediscovered films
Rediscovered American films
1920s American films